William John Chudley (born 17 March 1988) is a rugby union player who plays at Scrum Half for Coventry in the RFU Championship.

He made his debut for Exeter against Sale Sharks on 1 September 2012.

Will joined Exeter from rivals Newcastle Falcons, Chudley joined Newcastle from Bedford Blues after catching the eye of Newcastle coach Alan Tait during Bedfords play-off semi-final defeat by Worcester in 2011.

He was in the team when Exeter Chiefs defeated Wasps to be crowned champions of the 2016-17 English Premiership.

In December 2017, he was awarded Try of the week for his week 11 try against Northampton Saints.

On 20 March 2018, it was announced that Chudley would leave Exeter to join local rivals Bath ahead of the 2018–19 season.

He would leave Bath and join Worcester Warriors on a two-year contract from the 2021–22 season.

On 5 October 2022 all Worcester players had their contacts terminated due to the liquidation of the company to which they were contracted. On 12 October 2022, Chudley signs for Coventry in the RFU Championship for the 2022–23 season.

References

External links
 Chiefs Profile
 Premiership Rugby Profile
 http://en.espn.co.uk/england/rugby/player/148724.html
 itsrugby Profile

1988 births
Living people
Bath Rugby players
Bedford Blues players
English rugby union players
Exeter Chiefs players
Newcastle Falcons players
Rugby union players from Kettering
Worcester Warriors players
Rugby union scrum-halves
Coventry R.F.C. players